Roundhead is an unincorporated community in southeastern Roundhead Township, Hardin County, Ohio, United States.  It has a post office with the ZIP code 43346.

History

The first Euro-American settlement at Roundhead was made in 1832 on the site of a former Wyandot Indian village. The community is named for the Wyandot chief Roundhead. During its history, the community has also been referred to as "Round Head," "Round Heads," "Round Headstown," and "Roundheads Town." A post office has been in operation at Roundhead since 1837.

An archaeological site, the Zimmerman Kame, is located in the Roundhead vicinity; it is listed on the National Register of Historic Places.

Geography
Despite Roundhead's proximity to Indian Lake and the Great Miami River, which flows out of it to the Ohio River at Cincinnati, the community is drained by the headwaters of the Scioto River, which meets the Ohio River at Portsmouth.

Community
Besides its post office, the community includes a Park, a volunteer fire department, a United Methodist Church, a restaurant/bar, and two cemeteries.

References

Unincorporated communities in Ohio
Unincorporated communities in Hardin County, Ohio
Populated places established in 1832
1832 establishments in Ohio